Elín Þóra Elíasdóttir (born 7 June 1992) is an Icelandic badminton player.

Career 
Elín made it to the semi finals of Iceland International tournament in 2009 and was the runner-up in 2012, with her partner Helgi Jóhannesson, losing in the finals against Chou Tien-chen and Chiang Mei-hui. In 2013, she won Icelandic National Badminton Championships in the women's doubles event with her partner Rakel Jóhannesdótir.

Achievements

BWF International Challenge/Series 
Mixed doubles

  BWF International Challenge tournament
  BWF International Series tournament
  BWF Future Series tournament

References

External links 
 

Living people
1992 births
Place of birth missing (living people)
Elin Thora Eliasdottir